Red Alert, also known as WW III, is a fixed shooter developed by Irem and released in arcades in July 1981.

Gameplay

In Red Alert, the player controls an anti-aircraft turret that can move left and right across the ground, and can only fire straight up. The objective of the game is to keep the turret alive, and to keep the attackers from destroying the city. To do this, the player must maneuver their turret under the attackers, and fire upwards into them, before they drop their bombs.

The game consists of six levels:
 France
 United States
 Italy
 England
 West Germany
 Japan

At the start of each level, a global map will be displayed, and over a radio a male voice will say "Red Alert! Enemy aircraft approaching [country name]!" Red Alert was one of the first games to have voice in a video game. Levels will be backdropped by famous landmarks specific to each country, such as the Eiffel Tower, the Empire State Building, and Mount Fuji. Each level consists of three rounds: Fighter planes, helicopters, and nighttime bombers. Before each round, a voice will say the type and number of enemies that are approaching, and to destroy them before a certain time or else an MIRV will be launched.

In the first round, the player is assaulted by a formation of 20 fighter aircraft, which drop small yellow bombs, and also will occasionally dive-bomb the player. These fighters can damage the player, but not the environment. A large, high-level bomber plane will also occasionally cross the screen to release a large red bomb. Shooting the bomb will cause a large explosion that can damage other enemies.

In the second round, a squadron helicopters will appear. These helicopters will fly to various locations above the level, and hover for a moment to drop a bomb on a parachute. These bombs will damage the player and the city, but can be shot in midair, at which point they will fall without detonating.

In the third and final round, night will fall, and the level will become pitch black, except for the player and the areas illuminated by two large spotlights, which slowly move back and forth across the bottom of the map. Planes will fly across the screen from both directions, dropping yellow bombs that can damage the player, and can destroy the spotlights. The planes will only be visible when they are in the beam of a spotlight, but the bombs that they drop are visible even in darkness.

When the third and final round is completed, a short cutscene will be shown. The sun will slowly rise over the level, a rainbow will appear across the screen, and the words "PEACE FOREVER" will appear. This signals the successful completion of the level.

At the top of the screen is a timer, which will count up from zero to a time determined before each round during the briefing. As the timer approaches its end, a warning tone will beep. If the player does not destroy the remaining enemies before the timer finishes, the enemies will leave the level, and the word "CAUTION" will appear on the screen. This means the MIRV has been launched. The MIRV will appear from the top of the screen. As the MIRV descends, it will break up into three clusters, each of which will then break up into three separate bombs. The player must shoot all of the bombs before they reach the ground.

References

External links

1981 video games
Arcade video games
Arcade-only video games
Fixed shooters
Irem games
Cold War video games
Video games developed in Japan